Mexacanthina is a genus of sea snails, marine gastropod mollusks in the family Muricidae, the murex snails or rock snails.

Species
Species within the genus Mexacanthina include:

 Mexacanthina angelica (Oldroyd, 1918)
 Mexacanthina lugubris (Sowerby, 1821)

References

Muricidae